Naputi is a surname. Notable people with the surname include:

Dylan Naputi (born 1995), Guamanian footballer
Ricky Naputi (1973–2012), Guamanian man who died from overeating